Aviron Pictures was an American film production and distribution company founded by William Sadleir, founder of Clarius Entertainment (which, as the company went inactive shortly after his departure, Aviron can be considered a successor of) and David Dinerstein, a founder of Paramount Classics and formerly of Lakeshore Entertainment and LD Entertainment, in 2017.

History
In May 2017, it was announced David Dinerstein had launched a film production and distribution company that would release up to eight wide release films, per year, starting off to distribute Kidnap, Drunk Parents, and The Strangers: Prey at Night. In February 2018, it was announced the company had acquired Serenity, and A Private War.

In 2019, a lawsuit was filed by investor BlackRock against Aviron and its founder William Sadlier, citing fraud and financial impropriety in the company structure. Sadlier subsequently exited from his role as the operating manager of Aviron Pictures, a subsidiary of Aviron Group, in January 2020; he had already had a history of sketchy financial health, even further proven from the short history of money-losing features from his previous company Clarius Entertainment, directly resulting in said company silently ending most operations shortly after his departure in 2015.

On May 22, 2020, U.S. Attorney for the Southern District of New York, Geoffrey Berman, announced multiple fraud charges against William Sadleir. He was charged with wire fraud and aggravated identity theft to convince BlackRock to invest $75 million in his Aviron Group, he then allegedly siphoned off more than $20 million from his production company and diverted more than $14 million of it into his mansion. Sadlier also allegedly redirected nearly $1 million of the Coronavirus Paycheck Protection Program loans he applied, meant to keep Aviron staff on payroll, for his personal debts. On January 19, 2022, Sadlier pled guilty and was sentenced on September 9, 2022 to 72 months in prison.

Filmography

See also
Neon
STX Entertainment
Rogue Pictures
A24
Annapurna Pictures
Blumhouse Productions
Bleecker Street
Drafthouse Films

References

External links
Official website

Film distributors of the United States
Mass media companies established in 2017
Mass media companies disestablished in 2020